Rachel Pavlou is the Women's Development Manager for Diversity & Inclusion at the Football Association (FA) in England and the Crown Dependencies of Jersey, Guernsey and the Isle of Man. Pavlou has helped the development of women's football at the FA for more than 20 years.

Pavlou helped the implementation of the FA Women's Super League and has managed both the FA participation and talent development programmes. She is a panel member of the Hall of Fame for both the FA Women's Super League and the National Football Museum.

Pavlou is a trustee of the Aston Villa FC Foundation, and she is a FIFA Women’s Football Development Expert.

Pavlou played football at primary school alongside boys and was chosen for football trials as a 7 year old. She was subsequently bought into school with her parents and told by her headteacher that "over his dead body" would she ever play football in a boys' team and that she should instead play "girls' sports". Pavlou has since described the altercation as a "completely and utterly defining moment".

References

  

The Football Association
Women's Super League
Living people
British sports executives and administrators
Year of birth missing (living people)
Place of birth missing (living people)
Women's football